Jortsku Cave Natural Monument  is a karst cave located 5.5 km to the north of village Second Balda  in Martvili Municipality in Samegrelo-Zemo Svaneti region of Georgia, 653 meters above sea level. Cave is on the left bank of Jortsku river, the tributary of Abasha river.

Morphology 
Jortsku Cave has two storey and maximum length of 276 m. Large entrance hallway leads to a meandering corridor, 3-5 m high and 4-5 m wide. Near the cave entrance ceiling collapsed in the past. Further inside, about 100 meters from the entrance, two branches emerges, one of which opens to the second floor with 30 m long hall. 
Stalactites are predominant feature of Jortsku Cave, but a few stalagmites also can be seen. 3.5 to 4 m thick plastic clay is in abundance in the cave hall. 
The stream flows into the cave, than joins the second stream, and after 15 m passes through to emerge as a spring on the left bank of the Jortsku river. 
The temperature in the entrance part of the cave is 18°C, gradually dropping to 11.5°C in the last section of the cave.

Paleontological findings 
Paleontological findings established presence of cave dwellers in an ancient past. Bones of cave bears, lynx, and other animals also has been found in the cave.

References

Natural monuments of Georgia (country)
Caves of Georgia (country)
Protected areas established in 2013
Geography of Samegrelo-Zemo Svaneti